(Ya Hossein) Tazarve ("Pheasant") is an Iranian-made jet training aircraft, first revealed during Iran airshow 2002, in Kish.

Iran began a programme to develop a jet trainer in the early 1990s, first flying a proof of concept aircraft, the Dorna in 1995, a second, much modified aircraft, the Tondar flying in 1998, with a third aircraft, the Tazarve introducing further revisions. This third prototype was publicly unveiled at the Iran Kish Air Show in October–November 2002.

The Tazarve is a small aircraft of all composite (carbon fibre and glass-reinforced plastic construction, with a mid-mounted straight wing). It is powered by a single General Electric J85 jet engine, procured from existing Islamic Republic of Iran Air Force stocks.  An order for five development examples and 25 production aircraft was placed by the Iranian air Force. At least the pre-production aircraft appear to have been built by 2008.

Specifications

See also

References

Further reading

 

2000s Iranian military trainer aircraft